Daniel Isenhour House and Farm is a historic home and farm and national historic district located near Gold Hill, Cabarrus County, North Carolina. The district encompasses three contributing buildings and one contributing site. The farmhouse was built about 1843, and is a two-story, frame dwelling with a one-story ell and Italianate style design elements.  Also on the property are the contributing farm landscape a smokehouse (c. 1850-1875), and log barn (c. 1843-1850).

It was listed on the National Register of Historic Places in 2000.

References

Farms on the National Register of Historic Places in North Carolina
Historic districts on the National Register of Historic Places in North Carolina
Italianate architecture in North Carolina
Houses completed in 1843
Houses in Cabarrus County, North Carolina
National Register of Historic Places in Cabarrus County, North Carolina
1843 establishments in North Carolina